Libby station is a station stop for the Amtrak Empire Builder in Libby, Montana.  The station, platform, and parking are owned by BNSF Railway.

History
In 1890, the Great Northern Railway began establishing a station in Libby along their main line. The first train service arrived at the station on May 3, 1892, carrying a mix of passengers and cargo. In 1970, the station came under the ownership of the Burlington Northern Railway due to Great Northern's merging into the company. In 1996, Burlington Northern merged with the Atchison, Topeka and Santa Fe Railway to become BNSF Railway, the current owner of the property.

Station
The station platform is uncovered and sits north-adjacent to a small Swiss chalet style building used as a waiting room for passengers. The station formerly had another platform in service south-adjacent to the waiting room as well. The southern platform is no longer used but the tracks remain in place. The old tracks are partially graded down for easy access to the parking lot.

Bibliography

Notes and references

External links 

Libby Amtrak Station (USA Rail Guide -- Train Web)

Amtrak stations in Montana
Buildings and structures in Lincoln County, Montana
Former Great Northern Railway (U.S.) stations
1893 establishments in Montana
Railway stations in the United States opened in 1893